The Department of Managed Health Care (DMHC) is a regulatory body governing managed health care plans, sometimes referred to as Health Maintenance Organizations (HMOs) in California. The DMHC was created as the first state department in the country solely dedicated to regulating managed health care plans and assisting consumers to resolve disputes with their health plans. The DMHC Help Center educates consumers about their health care rights, resolves consumer complaints, helps consumers navigate and understand their coverage and assists consumers in getting timely access to appropriate health care services.

The DMHC Help Center provides direct assistance in all languages to health care consumers through the Department’s website, www.HealthHelp.ca.gov, and a toll-free phone number, 1-888-466-2219.

Mary Watanabe is currently the director of the DMHC. The DMHC is part of the California Health and Human Services Agency.  It was established in 2000 and is responsible for enforcing the Knox-Keene Health Care Service Plan Act of 1975, and other related laws and regulations.

Dual health insurance regulation 
The DMHC regulates the majority of state-regulated health care coverage in California including 96% of commercial and government health plan enrollment. However, not all health plans operating in California are under the jurisdiction of the DMHC; for example, some preferred provider organizations are regulated by the California Department of Insurance (CDI). Two state-based health insurance regulators is unusual in the United States, and has led to various additional work to synchronize laws. This dual regulation arose due for historical reasons, and when the DMHC was created in 2000, the California legislature requested a report on merging the health insurer responsibilities with the CDI. In 2001, J. Clark Kelso, who served as acting California Insurance Commissioner in 2000, produced a report outlining costs and benefits of agency consolidation.

In addition, the federal government regulates health insurance for members of the military, and "self-insured" or ERISA plans, offered by some large employers are under the jurisdiction of the U.S. Department of Labor.

Knox-Keene licenses 
In 2020, 87 full-service health plans licensed by the DMHC provided health care services to more than 27.7 million Californians. This included more than 14 million commercial enrollees and approximately 13.6 million government enrollees. In addition to full-service health plans, the DMHC oversees 45 specialized health plans including chiropractic, dental, vision, behavioral health (psychological) and pharmacy.

History 
The agency was created in July 2000, in the wake of widespread dissatisfaction with managed care across the country and in response to concerns that the prior regulator, the California Department of Corporations, lacked medical and consumer protection expertise. At the time of its creation, California was the largest market for health maintenance organizations (HMOs) in the United States.

After it was created, Kaiser Permanente challenged its authority in court, but did not succeed.

See also 

 Healthcare in California

References

External links

 The Department of Managed Health Care in the California Code of Regulations

Healthcare in California
Managed care
Medical and health organizations based in California
State agencies of California